The God King is a 1974 British–Sri Lankan historical film directed by Lester James Peries. The film is based on the historical clash between brothers Kasyapa and Moggalana on Sigiriya Rock.

Producer Dimitri de Grunwald financed the epic film as a dual project between England and Sri Lanka. He provided the three main actors, the script, the assistant director, the production Manager, makeup artist and money while the task of making the film was given to the Sri Lankans.

Plot 
King Kasyapa (Leigh Lawson) is the son of King Dhatusena (Geoffrey Russell). Kasyapa murdered his father by walling him alive and then usurping the throne which rightfully belonged to his brother Mogallana (Ravindra Randeniya), Dhatusena's son by the true queen. Mogallana fled to India to escape being assassinated by Kasyapa but vowed revenge. In India he raised an army with the intention of returning and retaking the throne of Sri Lanka which was rightfully his. Knowing the inevitable return of Mogallana, Kasyapa is said to have built his palace on the summit of Sigiriya as a fortress and pleasure palace.

Cast

See also
Cinema of Sri Lanka
List of Asian historical drama films

References

External links 
 

1974 films
Films directed by Lester James Peries
Films produced by Dimitri de Grunwald
Films set in the Anuradhapura period
British multilingual films
1940s multilingual films
Sri Lankan historical films